Leanna Crawford is a Christian music singer-songwriter signed to Provident Label Group.

Background

Leanna Crawford grew up in northwestern Washington.  Crawford was home-schooled by her mom, a former teacher, along with her two sisters and brother and received her music business degree from Northwest University in Kirkland, Washington.
 
In 2012, Leanna went on a mission retreat, where she felt God spoke to her, calling her into music ministry. In 2013 Crawford won Praise106.5's Music Search with her song, "Moment by Moment", produced by Dove Award-winning producer, Ed Cash.

Career 

Soon after moving to Nashville, Crawford was signed as the first female artist to Story House Collective's roster by Grammy Nominated & Dove Award winner Matthew West. She has since toured with notable artists such as Michael W. Smith, Matthew West, Jeremy Camp, Tenth Avenue North, Matt Maher, Plumb & Jordan Feliz.

In 2018, Crawford debuted a six-song EP titled Crazy Beautiful You in 2018 as well as a two-track Christmas single.

In October 2019, Crawford signed to Provident Label Group/Story House Music. "Funeral" was the first radio single released from Crawford's EP which came out May 2020.  The next single “Truth I’m Standing On”, also from the EP, was a Top 30 song on the Billboard Christian Airplay chart. The latest single from the EP is "Mean Girls" reached Top 20 on the Billboard Christian Airplay chart.

Leanna was nominated as Female Artist of the Year for the 2021 K-LOVE Fan Awards.

Discography

EPs
Leanna Crawford (Provident Label Group, May 1, 2020)
Crazy Beautiful You (Story House Collective, January 19, 2018)

Singles 

"Christmas Dreaming"/"Angels We Have Heard on High" (2018)
"Funeral" (2020)
"Truth I'm Standing On" (2020)
"Mean Girls" (featuring Jekalyn Carr) (2021)
"What You Can't Forget" (2021)
"Breath of Heaven (Mary's Song)" (2021)
"Before I Knew Jesus" (2022)
"How Can You Not" (2022)
"Simple" (2022)

References

External links
 

Living people
American women singer-songwriters
Christian music songwriters
Northwest University (United States) alumni
Musicians from Kirkland, Washington
21st-century American women
Singer-songwriters from Washington (state)
1995 births